The 2007–08 New York Knicks season was the 62nd season of NBA basketball in New York City. It began in October and ended with a loss against the Pacers in April. The Knicks missed the playoffs for the fourth straight year and equalled the most losses in a season in franchise history. As a result, Isiah Thomas was fired from GM and head coach with Donnie Walsh saying ''...we reached a point this season when our team didn't compete for a long time.'' 

Key dates prior to the start of the season:

The 2007 NBA draft took place in New York City on June 28.
The free agency period begins in July.

Offseason

Draft picks
New York's selection from the 2007 NBA draft in New York City.

Roster

Regular season

Standings

Record vs. opponents

Game log

November 
Record: 5–10; Home: 5–3; Road: 0–7

December 
Record: 3–11; Home: 2–7; Road: 1–4

January 
Record: 6–10; Home: 3–4; Road: 3–6

February 
Record: 4–9; Home: 2–3; Road: 2–6

March 
Record: 2–13; Home: 1–7; Road: 1–6

April 
Record: 3–6; Home: 2–2; Road: 1–4

Green background indicates win.
Red background indicates loss.

Player stats

Regular season

Awards and records

Records

Milestones

Transactions
The Knicks have been involved in the following transactions during the 2007–08 season.

Trades

See also
2007–08 NBA season

References

External links

New York Knicks seasons
New York Knicks
New York Knicks
New York Knicks
2000s in Manhattan
Madison Square Garden